Waller Independent School District is a public school district based in Waller, Texas (USA).

In addition to Waller, the district serves the cities of Prairie View and Pine Island. In addition it serves unincorporated sections of Waller County, including Fields Store, and unincorporated sections of Harris County, including Hockley.

In 2013, Waller ISD and all 8 schools earned the highest Texas Education Agency accountability rating, 'Met Standard.' Five schools received 8 Academic Achievement Distinction Designations.  In 2010, the school district was rated "Recognized" by the Texas Education Agency. The ISD American football teams play at the 10,000-capacity Waller ISD Stadium.

Schools

Secondary schools 
 Waller High School (unincorporated Harris County, near Waller) 
Waller Junior High School (Waller)
Wayne C. Schultz Junior High School (Waller)

Primary schools 
Primary schools cover pre-Kindergarten through 5th Grade.
 Fields Store Elementary School (Fields Store, Unincorporated Waller County)
 I. T. Holleman Elementary School (Waller)
 Herman T. Jones Elementary School (Prairie View)
 Roberts Road Elementary School (Hockley, unincorporated Harris County)
 Turlington Elementary School (Hockley, unincorporated Harris County)

References

External links 

 Waller ISD

School districts in Waller County, Texas
School districts in Harris County, Texas